Faxian (法顯 ; 337 CE – c. 422 CE), also referred to as Fa-Hien, Fa-hsien and Sehi, was a Chinese Buddhist monk and translator who traveled by foot from China to India to acquire Buddhist texts. Starting his arduous journey about age 60, he visited sacred Buddhist sites in Central, South and Southeast Asia between 399 and 412 CE, of which 10 years were spent in India.

He described his journey in his travelogue, A Record of Buddhist Kingdoms (Foguo Ji 佛國記). His memoirs are notable independent record of early Buddhism in India. He took with him a large number of Sanskrit texts, whose translations influenced East Asian Buddhism and which provide a terminus ante quem for many historical names, events, texts, and ideas therein.

Biography

Faxian was born in Shanxi in the 4th-century during the reign of the Eastern Jin dynasty. His original family name was Gong, and his birth name was Sehi. He later adopted the name Faxian, which literally means "Splendor of Dharma".

In 399 CE, about age 60, Faxian was among the earliest attested pilgrims to India. He set out with nine others to locate sacred Buddhist texts. He visited India in the early fifth century. He is said to have walked all the way from  China across the icy desert and rugged mountain passes. He entered India from the northwest and reached Pataliputra. He took back with him a large number of Sanskrit Buddhist texts and images sacred to Buddhism. Upon his return to China, he is also credited with translating these Sanskrit texts into Chinese.

Faxian's visit to India occurred during the reign of Chandragupta II. He entered the Indian subcontinent through the northwest. His memoir describe his 10 year stay in India. He visited the major sites associated with the Buddha, as well the renowned centers of education and Buddhist monasteries. He visited Kapilvastu (Lumbini), Bodh Gaya, Benares (Varanasi), Shravasti, and Kushinagar, all linked to events in Buddha's life. Faxian learned Sanskrit, and collected Indian literature from Pataliputra (Patna), Oddiyana, and Taxila in Gandhara. His memoir mentions the Hinayana (Theravada) and emerging Mahayana traditions, as well as the splintering and dissenting Theravada sub-traditions in 5th-century Indian Buddhism. Before he had begun his journey back to China, he had amassed a large number of Sanskrit texts of his times.

On Faxian's way back to China, after a two-year stay in Sri Lanka, a violent storm drove his ship onto an island, probably Java. He spent the rest of his life translating and editing the scriptures he had collected. These were influential to the history of Chinese Buddhism that followed.

Faxian wrote a book on his travels, filled with accounts of early Buddhism, and the geography and history of numerous countries along the Silk Road as they were, at the turn of the 5th century CE. He wrote about cities like Taxila, Pataliputra, Mathura, and Kannauj in Madhyadesha. He also wrote that inhabitants of Madhyadesha eat and dress like Chinese people. He declared Patliputra to be a prosperous city. He returned in 412 and settled in what is now Nanjing. In 414, he wrote (or dictated) Foguoji (A Record of Buddhistic Kingdoms; also known as Faxian's Account). He spent the next decade, until his death, translating the Buddhist sutras he had brought with him from India.

Legge's biographical notes on Faxian
The following is the introduction to a 19th-century translation of Faxian's work by James Legge. The speculations of Legge below, such as Faxian visiting India at the age of 25, have been discredited by later scholarship. His introduction provides some useful biographical information about Faxian:

Faxian memoir

Faxian's memoirs are an independent record of the society and culture of places he visited, particularly ancient India around 400 CE. His translations of Sanskrit texts he took with him to China are an important means to date texts, named individuals and Buddhist traditions. They provide a terminus ante quem for many historical names, manuscripts, events, and ideas therein.

He noted that central Asian cities such as Khotan were Buddhist, with the clergy reading Indian manuscripts in Indian languages. The local community revered the monks. In Taxila (now in Pakistan), states Faxian, he mentions a flourishing Buddhist community midst non-Buddhists. He describes elaborate rituals and public worship ceremonies, with support of the king, in the honor of the Buddha in India and Sri Lanka. He left India about 409 from Tamralipti – a port he states to be on its eastern coast. However, some of his Chinese companion pilgrims who came with him on the journey decided to stay in India.

Impressions of India

 Struggles at sea during the return journey through Java

Works

Translations
French
 .

English
 James Legge (1886, trans.), A Record of Buddhistic Kingdoms, Being an Account by the Chinese Monk Fâ-hien of His Travels in India and Ceylon (A.D. 399-414) in Search of the Buddhist Books of Discipline, Asian Educational Services, 1993; 
 Herbert A. Giles (1877, trans.), Record of the Buddhistic Kingdoms: Translated From the Chinese, Cornell University Library (June 25, 2009);

See also 
 Sects of Buddhism
 Silk Road transmission of Buddhism
 Chinese Buddhism
 Xuanzang
 Yijing (monk)
 Song Yun
 Hyecho
 Fa Hien Cave
 Great Tang Records on the Western Regions
 A Record of Buddhist Practices Sent Home from the Southern Sea
 Wang ocheonchukguk jeon
 Journey to the West

References

Bibliography 
 Beal, Samuel. 1884. Si-Yu-Ki: Buddhist Records of the Western World, by Hiuen Tsiang. 2 vols. Translated by Samuel Beal. London. 1884. Reprint: Delhi. Oriental Books Reprint Corporation. 1969. (Also contains a translation of Faxian's book on pp. xxiii–lxxxiii). Volume 1 ; Volume 2.
Hodge, Stephen (2009 & 2012), "The Textual Transmission of the Mahayana Mahaparinirvana-sutra", lecture at the University of Hamburg 
 Legge, James 1886. A Record of Buddhistic Kingdoms: Being an account by the Chinese Monk Fa-Hien of his travels in India and Ceylon (A.D. 399–414) in search of the Buddhist Books of Discipline . Oxford, Clarendon Press. Reprint: New York, Paragon Book Reprint Corp. 1965. 
 Rongxi, Li; Dalia, Albert A. (2002). The Lives of Great Monks and Nuns, Berkeley, Calif.: Numata Center for Translation and Research
 Sen, T. (2006). "The Travel Records of Chinese Pilgrims Faxian, Xuanzang, and Yijing", Education About Asia 11 (3), 24–33
 Weerawardane, Prasani (2009). "Journey to the West: Dusty Roads, Stormy Seas and Transcendence", Biblioasia 5 (2), 14–18
Jain, Sandhya, & Jain, Meenakshi (2011). The India they saw: Foreign accounts. New Delhi: Ocean Books.

External links
 
 
 Faxian and other Chinese pilgrims, Columbia University Archives
 Original Chinese text, Taisho 2085
 Legge's translation with original Chinese text, T 2085
 Record of Buddhistic Kingdoms , University of Adelaide
 Record of Buddhistic Kingdoms (Complete HTML at web.archive.org), University of Adelaide

Chinese explorers
Chinese scholars of Buddhism
Sanskrit–Chinese translators
Jin dynasty (266–420) Buddhists
Liu Song Buddhist monks
Pilgrimage accounts
337 births
Chinese travel writers
Historiography of India
Explorers of India
422 deaths
Later Zhao Buddhist monks
Jin dynasty (266–420) translators
Liu Song translators
People from Changzhi
Writers from Shanxi
Later Qin Buddhist monks